Gustakh Ishq is a Pakistani television series premiered on Urdu 1 on 12 July 2017. It is produced by Moomal Shunaid under her production banner Moomal Productions with Rafay Rashdi as a managing partner. It features Zahid Ahmed, Iqra Aziz and Noor Khan.

Plot
The story revolves around lead protagonist Najaf (Iqra Aziz), a bright girl from a middle class background, living in Hyderabad in a modest environment with her much younger step-sisters, father Quddos (Firdous Jamal) and step mother Khalda (Annie Zaidi). Najaf's step mother has never truly accepted Najaf as a daughter and tries to keep her away from her sisters as well. Najaf frequently visits Moosa Bhai at a nearby mosque to seek advice on dealing with the difficulties and loneliness in her life. Najaf's life changes when the affluent, young owner of her college, Sikander Iqbal (Zahid Ahmed), order her expulsion from the college due to a misunderstanding. Najaf's father takes up a job in Saudi Arabia and Najaf is sent to live with her Mamu (mother's brother), Rashid, and his family.

At her Mamu's place, Najaf is mistreated by her Mami, Kinza who sees Najaf as an extra mouth to feed. Kinza's son Zubair takes a liking to Najaf. Sikandar is also known to the family and on a visit to his house, Najaf meets his niece, Dua. It is revealed that Sikandar's sister Naima had been estranged from their father Iqbal after she married a middle class man. She died after giving birth to Dua and left her in Sikandar's care. Sikandar is very protective of Dua and fulfils all her wishes. He ends up hiring Najaf as Dua's governess after the two strike up an instantaneous friendship. Najaf moves in to the Iqbals' house and brings positive changes in Dua's health.

Najaf and Sikandar initially clash on how they should care for Dua but finally start agreeing. Meanwhile, Sikandar's friend Maliha is shown to have been in love with him since a long time. Sikandar, however, insists that they remain friends as he feels they are very different people. In the meantime, Zubair proposes marriage to Najaf having fallen in love with her but she refuses saying she sees him only as a cousin and nothing more. Najaf's Mamu reveals to her that Maliha is, in fact, her own sister and was adopted by a woman named Samina when she was a baby.

Iqbal and Samina plot to force Sikandar to become engaged to Maliha. Sikandar remains aloof despite the engagement and as he discovers more about Najaf, gradually starts liking her. Having been brought up by the well to do Samina, Maliha takes an instant dislike to Najaf and her increasing closeness to Sikandar because of their love and concern for Dua. Discovering how Samina and Iqbal used their children for their own egos, Sikandar eventually calls off the engagement with Maliha and promptly proposes to Najaf who he has fallen in love with. Najaf refuses, appalled by the idea of robbing her own sister's happiness. She leaves her job and returns to her Mamu's place.

After several attempts by Samina to bring Maliha and Sikandar together and Maliha's hateful words for Najaf, Sikandar is forced to reveal to Maliha that she and Najaf are sisters. Eventually, Sikandar visits Rashid Mamu with a proposal for Najaf's hand in marriage and assures Najaf that even if she were to say no, he wouldn't get back together with Maliha. After this admission, Najaf accepts and the two are married. However, Maliha, who has been pretending to be a good sister and friend to Najaf, resolves to win Sikandar.

Cast

Zahid Ahmed as Sikandar Iqbal
Iqra Aziz as Najaf Quddus
Noor Khan as Maliha
Firdous Jamal as Abd-ul-Quddus Sahab
Abid Ali as Malik Iqbal
Khalid Zafar as Rashid Sahab (Najaf's maternal uncle)
Annie Zaidi as Khalida
Danial Afzal Khan as Zubair Rashid
Kinza Malik as Mumtaz (Zubair's mother)

References

External links
Official website

Pakistani drama television series
2017 Pakistani television series debuts
Urdu-language television shows